The Transport of Rockland (TOR) is the bus system for Rockland County, New York, providing service along major routes in Rockland County, as well as connections to Clarkstown Mini-Trans in Clarkstown, Spring Valley Jitney in Spring Valley, the Bee-Line Bus System in Westchester as well as connections to Rockland Coaches and Short Line Bus routes providing commuter and local service to Northern New Jersey and New York City's Port Authority Bus Terminal, George Washington Bridge Bus Station, 5th Avenue, and Long Island. Annual ridership in 2008 was 3,862,232.

Service area
Operations of fixed-route service is provided by Transdev of Hillburn, New York, as of November 1, 2018. The previous contractor was Brega Transport Corporation for routes within Rockland County,

TOR provides service primarily along county and state highway corridors in Rockland County, along with shuttle routes servicing the towns of Ramapo, Clarkstown, and the Village of Spring Valley. There are other minibus services provided by those towns that supplement TOR service.

Fare
The standard one-way fare for Transport of Rockland fixed-route services is $2.00 Transfers cost $1.00. Fares on Clarkstown Mini-Trans and Spring Valley Jitney are $1.50 with transfers at 30 cents.

TOR transfers are valid on other TOR buses, Spring Valley Jitney vans, Lower Hudson Transit Link buses, and Clarkstown Mini-Trans vans. Lower Hudson Transit Link transfers, in addition to validity on these service, are also valid for a connecting Bee-Line bus or the CT Transit Stamford I-Bus to Greenwich, CT, and Stamford, CT.

Paratransit
The County of Rockland also operates Transportation Resources Intra-County for Physically Handicapped and Senior Citizens (T.R.I.P.S.), the ADA-mandated curbside-to-curbside para-transit bus service for Rockland County residents who are physically or mentally challenged. In addition, senior citizens over the age of 60 who find it difficult or impossible to use fixed-route bus service can also use this service.

Routes
The Transport of Rockland provides service along twelve routes. All service is accessible to customers with mobility impairments.

The full route is shown except for branching.

Tappan ZEExpress (discontinued)
Service on the Tappan ZEExpress was discontinued in October 2018. Service across the Tappan Zee Bridge is now provided by Lower Hudson Transit Link buses owned by the New York State Department of Transportation operated by Transdev.

Roster

References

External links
 Rockland County Department of Public Transportation
 tzxbus.com, an interactive Tappan Zee Express schedule
 , Lower Hudson Transit Link website.

Bus transportation in New York (state)
Transportation in Rockland County, New York
Surface transportation in Greater New York